

103001–103100 

|-bgcolor=#f2f2f2
| colspan=4 align=center | 
|}

103101–103200 

|-bgcolor=#f2f2f2
| colspan=4 align=center | 
|}

103201–103300 

|-id=220
| 103220 Kwongchuikuen ||  || Kwong Chui Kuen (born 1960), American producer of television documentaries, and the wife of the discoverer (this was his first minor planet) || 
|}

103301–103400 

|-bgcolor=#f2f2f2
| colspan=4 align=center | 
|}

103401–103500 

|-id=421
| 103421 Laurmatt ||  || Laurenne Greco (born 1991) and Mattia Vivarelli (born 1986), Italian amateur astronomers engaged in meteor research at San Marcello Pistoiese Observatory || 
|-id=422
| 103422 Laurisirén ||  || Lauri Sirén (1921–), Finnish amateur astronomer and founder of the amateur astronomical association Jyväskylän Sirius || 
|-id=460
| 103460 Dieterherrmann ||  || Dieter B. Herrmann (born 1939), German astronomer and physicist and director of the director of the Archenhold Observatory in Berlin || 
|}

103501–103600 

|-id=560
| 103560 Peate ||  || John Peate (1820–1902) was an amateur optician who fabricated large telescope mirrors in the late 19th century, culminating with a 62" mirror in 1897, then the largest in the world. That mirror is now kept in the collections of the Smithsonian Institution, National Museum of American History in Washington DC. || 
|}

103601–103700 

|-bgcolor=#f2f2f2
| colspan=4 align=center | 
|}

103701–103800 

|-id=733
| 103733 Bernardharris ||  || Bernard Anthony Harris Jr. (born 1956) is a former NASA astronaut who flew on two space shuttle missions. In 1993, he was a mission specialist who carried out research as part of Spacelab D-2. As Payload Commander on the space shuttle in 1995, he became the first African American to conduct a spacewalk. || 
|-id=734
| 103734 Winstonscott ||  || Winston Elliott Scott (born 1950) is a former NASA astronaut who has flown two missions into space. Scott completed three spacewalks to retrieve satellites and evaluate the assembly of the International Space Station. He also performed experiments about the effects of zero gravity on the human body. || 
|-id=737
| 103737 Curbeam ||  || Robert Lee Curbeam Jr (born 1962) is a retired NASA astronaut and the first person to perform four spacewalks on a single mission. While in space Curbeam helped to fix a solar panel and install a new truss in the International Space Station. He has totaled more than 37 days in space and 45 hours on spacewalks. || 
|-id=738
| 103738 Stephaniewilson ||  || Stephanie Diana Wilson (born 1966) is a NASA astronaut and the second African American women to fly in space. She has flown on three missions and as of 2020, she has logged the most time in space of any African American astronaut (42 days). She also served as the ground commander for the first all-women spacewalk in 2019. || 
|-id=739
| 103739 Higginbotham ||  || Joan Higginbotham (born 1964) is an electrical engineer and former NASA Astronaut. She actively participated in 53 space shuttle launches as an engineer at Kennedy Space Center before becoming the third African American woman to go into space. || 
|-id=740
| 103740 Budinger ||  || Donald V. Budinger (born 1942), American chairman and founding director of the Rodel Foundations and Science Foundation Arizona || 
|-id=770
| 103770 Wilfriedlang ||  || Wilfried Lang (born 1951), a German engineer || 
|}

103801–103900 

|-bgcolor=#f2f2f2
| colspan=4 align=center | 
|}

103901–104000 

|-id=966
| 103966 Luni ||  || The Italian municipality of Luni, an ancient and powerful Roman city founded in 177 BC on the shores of the Ligurian Sea || 
|}

References 

103001-104000